Árpád Makay (1911–2004) was a Hungarian cinematographer.

Selected filmography
 Deadly Spring (1939)
 Rózsafabot (1940)
 Gül Baba (1940)
 Háry János (1941)
 I Am Guilty (1942)
 Magdolna (1942)
 Something Is in the Water (1944)
 Song of the Cornfields (1947)
 Treasured Earth (1948)

Bibliography
 Burns, Bryan. World Cinema: Hungary. Fairleigh Dickinson University Press, 1996.

External links

1911 births
2004 deaths
Hungarian cinematographers